Arthur Fitzhardinge Kingscote (12 July 1841 – 5 February 1881) was an English cricketer.  Kingscote was born at Westminster in London.

Kingscote played three first-class matches for the Marylebone Cricket Club from 1858 to 1859.  He made his first-class debut against Cambridge University and played two further fixtures for the club against the same opposition and against the Gentlemen of Kent.

Kingscote died at Fulham, London on 5 February 1881.

Family
Kingscote's father, Henry Robert Kingscote, was an early Hampshire player and also represented Surrey, Sussex and the Marylebone Cricket Club. His cousin Henry Bloomfield Kingscote also played first-class cricket.

References

External links

1841 births
1881 deaths
People from Westminster
Cricketers from Greater London
English cricketers
Marylebone Cricket Club cricketers
Gentlemen of England cricketers